Peter Paul Castiglione (February 13, 1921 – April 22, 2010) was an infielder in Major League Baseball player for eight seasons from 1947 to 1954.  Born on February 13, 1921, he initially signed a baseball contract to play for the Pittsburgh Pirates out of High School, and then played three seasons in the minor leagues from 1940 to 1942, before joining the United States Navy during World War II.  After the war, he returned to the Pirates' organization in 1946, joining the major league club during the 1947 season.  He played for the Pirates until June 14, 1953, when he was traded to the St. Louis Cardinals for Hal Rice.  Castiglione played the rest of 1953 season and the 1954 season in the Cardinals' organization.  He played an additional five seasons in the minor leagues before retiring from baseball.

After his baseball career, he moved to Pompano Beach, Florida where he worked for the postal service as a letter carrier, and was active in local sporting community by refereeing and umpiring.  He also scouted for the Pirates during his later years, as well as coaching High School and American Legion baseball teams.  He died at the age of 89 in Pompano Beach.

References

External links

1921 births
2010 deaths
American expatriate baseball players in Canada
Baseball players from Connecticut
Buffalo Bisons (minor league) players
Harrisburg Senators players
Indianapolis Indians players
Little Rock Travelers players
Major League Baseball infielders
People from Pompano Beach, Florida
Pittsburgh Pirates players
Rochester Red Wings players
Selma Cloverleafs players
Sportspeople from Greenwich, Connecticut
St. Louis Cardinals players
Toronto Maple Leafs (International League) players
United States Navy personnel of World War II
High school baseball coaches in the United States